Burbach is a name meaning "farmer's brook" (from Old High German bur "farmer" + bach "brook"). It can refer to:

Places in Germany 
 Burbach, North Rhine-Westphalia, municipality in Siegen-Wittgenstein district
 Burbach, Rhineland-Palatinate, municipality in Bitburg-Prüm district
 Alstädten-Burbach, district of Hürth municipality, North Rhine-Westphalia
 districts of either
 Halver municipality, North Rhine-Westphalia
 Saarbrücken municipality, Saarland
 Marxzell, Baden-Württemberg
 Wutha-Farnroda, Thuringia
 Niederhambach, Rhineland-Palatinate

Places in France 
 Burbach, Bas-Rhin, France

Places in England 
 Burbach, an old name for Burbage, Wiltshire, England

People 
 Bill Burbach (born 1947), New York Yankees baseball player
  (born 1945), German diplomat and jurist
  (born 1975), German actress